Khatgal is a village in Mongolia on the southern tip of Lake Khövsgöl. Khatgal has an airstrip and a small port, plus a school and a post / telecom office.  There is a wooden bridge nearby over the Eg River.

History
Khatgal was founded in 1727 as a camp of the Mongolian watch post system. By 1910, a small settlement had formed, mainly through trade with Russia. In 1914 a telegraph connection was established from the Russian border town of Mondy to Uliastai via Khatgal, and in 1921, about 150 Russian settlers lived in Khatgal.

In the same year, Khatgal became an administrative center in the region. In 1931 it became the center of the newly established Khövsgöl Aimag, but shortly afterwards in 1933 the administration moved to Mörön.

The town had about 7000 inhabitants and a power plant in 1990, but the dry-up of transport routes and the closure of a local wool factory have led to high migration rates, leaving only 3,756 inhabitants in 1994 and 2,498 inhabitants in the 2000 census. The latest official population estimate is 2,796 (December 31, 2006 ). Khatgal also lost its status as a town and is now administratively part of the Alag-Erdene Sum. In 2007, Khatgal was connected to the Mongolian central power grid and to cell phone services.

State Great Khural member and former health minister Lamjavyn Gündalai was born in Khatgal.

Economy
Due to Khatgal's status as an access point to campsites along the west coast of Lake Khövsgöl, tourism has become one of the largest sectors of the town's economy.  This is amplified by the construction of an airport in the town in 2007.  MIAT Mongolian Airlines lists the town on its domestic schedule.

Climate
Khatgal experiences a subarctic climate (Köppen Dwc) with very long, very dry, frigid winters and short, cool, relatively wet summers. Sunshine is abundant year-round and is especially high during the winter for a location above the 50th parallel north.

See also
Khatgal Airport

References 

Districts of Khövsgöl Province
Populated places established in 1727